Sebastian Felipe Xavier Fernández-Garcia Armesto (born 3 June 1982) is a British film, television and theatre actor. He is the son of the historian Felipe Fernández-Armesto.

Career

Television and film
Armesto played Charles V, Holy Roman Emperor in the series The Tudors.  He starred in the 2008 ITV drama series The Palace as the King's carefree younger brother Prince George. He then played the character of Edmund Sparkler in the 2008 BBC version of Charles Dickens' novel Little Dorrit. In the 2011 film Pirates of the Caribbean: On Stranger Tides Armesto played the Spanish King Ferdinand VI. He played the poet and playwright Ben Jonson in Roland Emmerich's film Anonymous. In 2015 he played Lieutenant Dopheld Mitaka in Star Wars: The Force Awakens. He also played Tankard in the Poldark series in 2016 (7 episodes).

Armesto has also been in two stories of the British sci-fi series Doctor Who ("Bad Wolf/The Parting of the Ways", 2005) and Comte Louis de Provence in Marie Antoinette.

In March 2019, Armesto joined Cursed, a Netflix original television series based on a re-imaging of the Arthurian legend, in the role of Uther Pendragon. The first season was released on 17 July 2020.

Theatre
Armesto has acted in theatre productions in Britain, including three shows at the National Theatre and one at the Royal Court. He also writes and directs theatre with company Simple 8. His productions include directing and adapting Les Enfants du Paradis. He co-wrote and directed a play based on William Hogarth's The Four Stages of Cruelty and new versions of The Cabinet of Dr. Caligari and Moby-Dick.

Partial filmography

A Feast at Midnight (1995) .... Oberoi
Hawking (2004) .... Robert Silkin
The Bill (2005, TV Series) .... Tim Salcedo
Doctor Who (2005, TV Series) .... Broff
The Virgin Queen  (2005, TV Mini-Series) .... Charles Blount
The Impressionists (2006, TV Mini-Series) .... Art Critic
Marie Antoinette (2006) .... Comte de Provence
Ancient Rome: The Rise and Fall of an Empire (2006, TV Mini-Series) .... Honorius
Dear Steven Spielberg (2006, Short) .... Lawyer 6
The Tudors (2007, TV Series) .... Charles V
Blood Monkey (2007, Short) .... Josh Dawson
The Palace (2008, TV Mini-Series) .... Prince George
Loser's Anonymous (2008) .... Edward
Little Dorrit (2008, TV Series) .... Edmund Sparkler
Bright Star (2009) .... Mr. Haslam
Pirates of the Caribbean: On Stranger Tides (2011) .... Ferdinand VI of Spain
Anonymous (2011) .... Ben Jonson
Dead Cat (2013) .... Michael
Copenhagen (2014) .... Jeremy
Coalition (2015, Channel 4 TV movie) .... George Osborne
Star Wars: The Force Awakens (2015) .... Lieutenant Dopheld Mitaka
For Grace (2016) .... The Filmmaker
Poldark (2016, TV Series) .... Tankard
Close to the Enemy (2016, BBC2 TV miniseries written and directed by Stephen Poliakoff) .... Alex Lombard
Broadchurch (2017, TV Series) .... Clive Lucas
Tulip Fever (2017) .... Eduart Asmus
The Mercy (2018) .... Nelson Messina
The Terror (2018, TV Series) .... 2nd Mate Charles Frederick Des Voeux
Harlots (2018, TV Series) .... Josiah Hunt
Silent Witness (2019, TV Series) .... DI Taramelli
Gold Digger (2019, TV Mini-Series) .... Patrick Day
Cursed (2020, Web TV Series) .... Uther Pendragon

References

External links

1982 births
Living people
21st-century English male actors
English people of Spanish descent
English male television actors
People educated at Eton College
Place of birth missing (living people)